Borough 10 is a southeastern borough of Düsseldorf, the state capital of North Rhine-Westphalia, Germany. The borough covers an area of 5.30 square kilometres and (as of December 2020) has about 25,000 inhabitants, which makes it the smallest borough both by area and by population. The borough borders with the Düsseldorf borough 9 and with the rural district of Mettmann.

Subdivisions 
Borough 10 is made up of two Stadtteile (city parts):

See also 
 Boroughs of Düsseldorf

References

External links 
 Official webpage of the borough 

!